Serine/threonine-protein phosphatase 2A catalytic subunit beta isoform is an enzyme that in humans is encoded by the PPP2CB gene.

Function 

This gene encodes the phosphatase 2A catalytic subunit. Protein phosphatase 2A is one of the four major Ser/Thr phosphatases, and it is implicated in the negative control of cell growth and division. It consists of a common heteromeric core enzyme, which is composed of a catalytic subunit and a constant regulatory subunit, that associates with a variety of regulatory subunits. This gene encodes a beta isoform of the catalytic subunit. Two transcript variants encoding the same protein have been identified for this gene.

Interactions 

PPP2CB has been shown to interact with TLX1, PPP2R1B and PPP2R1A.

See also 
 PPP2CA

References

Further reading